Sudarca is a commune in Dondușeni District, Moldova. It is composed of two villages, Braicău and Sudarca.

References

Communes of Dondușeni District